KCBK is a Southern Gospel station licensed to Frederick, Oklahoma, broadcasting on 91.5 MHz FM. The station serves the areas of Lawton, Oklahoma and Wichita Falls, Texas and is owned by South Central Oklahoma Christian Broadcasting, Inc.

History
The station began broadcasting in July 1992, and held the call sign KSYE. KSYE was owned by Criswell College and aired Christian music, as well as Christian talk and teaching shows such as Back to the Bible with Woodrow Kroll, Insight for Living with Chuck Swindoll, Revive Our Hearts with Nancy Leigh DeMoss, and Turning Point with David Jeremiah. In 2010, Criswell College's radio stations were transferred to First Dallas Media as part of the school's separation from the First Baptist Church of Dallas.

In 2014, the station's call sign was changed to KCBK. In 2018, the station was sold to South Central Oklahoma Christian Broadcasting for $250,000, and it began airing a southern gospel format as an affiliate of The Gospel Station Network.

References

External links
http://www.thegospelstation.com

Southern Gospel radio stations in the United States
CBK
Radio stations established in 1992
1992 establishments in Oklahoma